Ascaric, Ascarich or Anscharic ( or Ascarico) is a Germanic name that appears in Latin sources as Asacarius, Assacarius, Assaccarius, Ascaricus or Askericus. It is a compound name derived from Proto-Germanic asca-, "ash," probably species of Fraxinus, meaning also "spear," and Proto-Germanic -ric < Celtic *rig-, meaning "ruler." Asca- may allude to the spear of *Wodanaz, a symbol of his inspirational power, or the name of the first man in the Germanic creation myth. -Ric was a common name suffix among early Germanic and Celtic men of status. Ascaric was used mainly by the Franks and Visigoths. It can refer to:

Ascaric (d. 306), Frankish war leader of the Bructeri executed by Constantine I
Ascaric (bishop of Palencia) (fl. 653)
Ascaric (archbishop of Braga) (d. 810)
Askericus (d. c. 890), Frankish bishop